The Book of Fortresses (Portuguese: Livro das Fortalezas) is a sixteenth-century manuscript written in 1509–1510 by the Royal Clerk Duarte de Armas at the behest  King Manuel I of Portugal. The work contains drawings of all the 56 Portuguese border castles, all of which have been personally visited by the author.
The book is considered to be a valuable source for the study of cartography and military architecture of the kingdom of Portugal.

History
King Manuel I (1495–1521) conducted extensive work to centralize and modernize the government of Portugal. Among the most important reforms, there are the Manueline Ordinances and called Reading Nova, the reform of the charters which resulted in 596 new charters throughout the kingdom. In another field, the monarch decreed the execution of the Armoury-Mor of the Book of Sintra room and the Book of Nobility and Perfeiçam Weapons, to regulate the use of heraldic arms in the kingdom and make manifest the will of the sovereign as a source of honor.

The Book of Fortresses, a part of the centralization and reform process, was needed to assess the military defenses of the kingdom. The monarch instructed Duarte de Armas, the Royal House squire, to inspect the fortifications along the border with the kingdom of Castile Duarte de Armas, accompanied by a servant on foot, toured the horse most castellated border settlements, preparing paper sketches (debuxos) with its panoramic (at least two per town from different directions) views. 
Contemporary research shows early spring 1509 as the start date of the work trip in Castro Marim, until their completion, seven months later, in September in Caminha. We were visited in this route 56 towns / castles. On his return to Lisbon, we were also visited Barcelos and Sintra. Having collected the material, the author organized a codex of two volumes, completed in March 1510.

Content
The two volumes Arms Duarte's work would come to be known as the Book of Fortresses, since the author did not name his work.
The codex containing the two volumes is now deposited in the National Archives of Torre do Tombo in Lisbon. The two volumes, with 139 folios in total, are now called:
Codex B, consisting of flax paper sheets, with 110 site plans, with dimensions of 296 x 404mm relating to settlements
Codex A, consisting of large sheets of parchment with multiple panoramic views  with the dimensions of 350 x 490mm for each town and castle. This codex also two non-border towns - Barcelos and Sintra - with one three views, respectively.
Scholars point out, in the last codex in particular, various illustrative aspects of daily life were added in order to humanize the images. Some notable drawings include humans and donkeys in Castelo Branco; pastors in Monsanto and Almeida; women who were fetching water in Ouguela and Montalban; or the hanged in Castle of Serpa and Elvas, an act which, paradoxically, give life to the images.
In addition to these figures, Duarte de Armas himself and his servant can be seen numerous times throughout the work. The two figures give the highly dynamic designs - see, for example, cases of Olivença and Castle of Freixo de Espada à Cinta. The author also drew sometimes small details of great beauty, like the birds in pens at Roias and the Castle of Laboreiro.

A detailed study of the work shows however that arms Duarte also paid attention to other important details. Minho river, for example, show caravans and large ships in Caminha at the mouth of the river. In addition to the written comments, the drawings themselves reveal the great power of the author's observation and attention to the essential part of the dept of the manuscript: the fortresses, that is, the walls, albarrã towers and keep, barbicans, breastplates, turrets, and battlements. 
The work is considered as living testimony of Sketching of current illustration technique at the time of King Manuel I. The author states in panoramic, the paths between each village with the distances, main access, state of roads, the land conformation, watercourses and navigability, bridges, fountains, wells, crops and orchards, military buildings, religious and civil, and others, in some cases even the neighboring Castilian village. The same is repeated in relation to plants, where it indicates the size, type and state of the defenses, height and thickness of the walls, distance between towers and turrets, purpose of magazines, access and others.
Regarding the instruments used by the professional, the work illustrates the use of the spear (which at the time replaced the medieval stick), the string and the compass.

List of Castles 
Except as noted, the Book of Fortresses has two views and a plan of all these castles and Raianos places. The given order is the one that appears in the work, which shows the author's route during their study trip in 1509.

References

External links 

https://www.bookoffortresses.org/

1509 books
Fortifications in Portugal
Portuguese books